Bruce Purchase (2 October 1938 – 5 June 2008) was a New Zealand actor known for his roles on stage and television. Born in Thames, New Zealand, he won a scholarship to study acting in England, training at RADA, and went on to become a founding actor-member of Laurence Olivier's National Theatre. He also performed regularly with the Royal Shakespeare Company.

His TV credits included Callan, The First Churchills, Clayhanger, A Picture of Katherine Mansfield, Doomwatch, Fall of Eagles, I, Claudius, The New Avengers, Doctor Who (in the serial The Pirate Planet), Blake's 7, Quatermass and The Tripods. His films included Macbeth (1971), Mary, Queen of Scots (1971), The Optimists of Nine Elms (1973), Soft Beds, Hard Battles (1974), Meetings with Remarkable Men (1979), Pope John Paul II (1984), Wallenberg: A Hero's Story (1985), Playing Away (1987), Lionheart (1987) and Another Life (2001).

In 2007, Purchase became seriously ill while touring with a production of The Last Confession.  He died of cancer on 5 June 2008 at his home in Putney, London.

Filmography 
Othello (1965) - Senators-Soldiers-Cypriots
Macbeth (1971) - Caithness
Mary, Queen of Scots (1971) - Morton
The Optimists of Nine Elms (1973) - Policeman
Soft Beds, Hard Battles (1974) - Colonel Meinertzhagen (uncredited)
Doctor Who, The Pirate Planet (1978) - The Captain
The Quatermass Conclusion (1979) - Tommy Roach
Meetings with Remarkable Men (1979) - Father Maxim
The Quiz Kid (1979) - Wally
Pope John Paul II (1984) - Jerzy Loparicz
Other Halves (1984) - Irwin
Wallenberg: A Hero's Story (1985) - Rabbi Mandel
Playing Away (1987) - Fredrick
Lionheart (1987) - Simon Nerra
Freddie as F.R.O.7 (1992) - Additional Voices (voice)
Richard III (1995) - City Gentleman
The Sea Change (1998) - Oldberg
Another Life (2001) - Sir Henry Curtis-Bennett (final film role)

References

External links 
 
 Telegraph obituary
 

1938 births
2008 deaths
Alumni of RADA
New Zealand male television actors
New Zealand male stage actors
New Zealand expatriates in the United Kingdom
Royal Shakespeare Company members
People from Thames, New Zealand